Twinkle Twinkle is a South Korean television series starring Kim Hyun-joo, Lee Yu-ri, Kim Suk-hoon and Kang Dong-ho. It aired on MBC TV from February 12 to August 14, 2011 on Saturdays and Sundays at 20:40 for 54 episodes.

Plot
Twinkle, Twinkle is a light, cheerful, and heartwarming family drama that tells the success story of Han Jung-won (Kim Hyun-joo), a workaholic career woman who is determined to make her own way in the world without the help of her family, which has garnered considerable wealth from their publishing company.

But what Jung-won doesn't know is that because of the hospital's negligence, she was switched at birth with another baby, Hwang Geum-ran (Lee Yu-ri). The identity swap resulted in the two girls being raised by families of different wealth and status, and living a different fate.

When Geum-ran learns the truth, she sees it as a way to reverse her poverty-stricken circumstances. But even after being restored to her rich biological parents, Geum-ran's bitterness makes her consider Jung-won her rival, and she continues to torment her. Jung-won, whose life has been turned upside down, faces numerous setbacks on the road to recovery.

Cast
Main characters
Kim Hyun-joo as Han/Hwang Jung-won
Lee Yu-ri as Hwang/Han Geum-ran
Kim Suk-hoon as Song Seung-joon
Kang Dong-ho as Kang Dae-beom

Han family
Jang Yong as Han Ji-woong
Park Jung-soo as Jin Na-hee
Kim Hyung-beom as Han Sang-won
Park Yu-hwan as Han Seo-woo
Jeon Soo-kyeong as Lee Eun-jung

Hwang family
Go Doo-shim as Lee Kwon-yang
Kil Yong-woo as Hwang Nam-bong
Lee Ah-hyun as Hwang Tae-ran
Han Ji-woo as Hwang Mi-ran
Kim Sang-ho as Park Joong-hyuk
Shin Soo-yeon as Park Ji-won

Extended cast
Kim Ji-young as Go Eun-hye
Jung Tae-woo as Yoon Seung-jae
Won Ki-joon as Jegal Joon-soo
Yoo Sa-ra as Han Song-yi
Gong Ki-tak as Song Kwang-hee
Kim Ji-seong as Team leader
Choi Su-rin as Lee Ji-soo
Im Chi-woo as Kwang-soo
Yoon Hee-seok as Nam Sung-woo
Joo Da-young as Hye-rin
Yoo Chae-yeong as Pi Ba-da (cameo)
Kim Soo-hyun

Viewership

Awards and nominations

References

External links
Twinkle Twinkle official MBC website 
Twinkle Twinkle at MBC Global Media

MBC TV television dramas
2011 South Korean television series debuts
2011 South Korean television series endings
Korean-language television shows
South Korean romance television series